Embolotherium (Greek ,  + ,  "battering ram beast", or "wedge beast") is an extinct genus of brontothere that lived in Mongolia during the late Eocene epoch. It is most easily recognized by a large bony protuberance emanating from the anterior (front) of the skull. This resembles a battering ram, hence the name Embolotherium. The animal is known from about 12 skulls, several jaws, and a variety of other skeletal elements from the Ulan Gochu formation of Inner Mongolia and the Irgilin Dzo of Outer Mongolia.

Taxonomy

Several species of Embolotherium have been named, including Embolotherium andrewsi, Embolotherium grangeri, Embolotherium louksi, Embolotherium ultimum, Embolotherium ergilensi, and Embolotherium efremovi. However, only two species, Embolotherium andrewsi and Embolotherium grangeri, appear to be valid. Other supposed species of Embolotherium are probably synonymous with these two species and were originally based on juvenile skulls, poorly preserved fossil material, or specimens that are not significantly different from either E. andrewsi or E. grangeri.

Another genus of brontothere, Titanodectes, which was named for several lower jaws found in the same sedimentary deposits as Embolotherium, probably represents the same beast as Embolotherium grangeri. Protembolotherium is another closely related genus from the Middle Eocene, which is distinguished by a noticeably smaller ram.

Description

Complete skeletons of Embolotherium have not yet been recovered. Based on the size of its skull, up to 94 cm in greatest length, it was estimated to exceed the largest North American brontotheres in size. The latter having an estimated shoulder height of 8 feet and mass of at least 2800 kg. Unlike many of the other Late Eocene brontotheres, there is no clear evidence that Embolotherium was sexually dimorphic. All known specimens have large rams. Therefore, coupled with the fact that the rams were hollow and fragile in comparison to the solid and sturdy horns of the North American brontotheres, such as Megacerops, it does not seem likely that the ram served as a weapon for contests between males. Rather, it might have had a non-sexual function, such as signaling to each other. The ram may have served as a specialized resonator for sound production. This hypothesis is suggested by the fact that the bony nasal cavity extends to the peak of the ram, thus implying that the nasal chamber was greatly elevated, possibly creating a resonating chamber.

References

 Barry Cox, Colin Harrison, R.J.G. Savage, and Brian Gardiner. (1999): The Simon & Schuster Encyclopedia of Dinosaurs and Prehistoric Creatures: A Visual Who's Who of Prehistoric Life. Simon & Schuster.
 David Norman. (2001): The Big Book of Dinosaurs. page 204, Walcome books.

External links

 BBC Online
 Fact File description

Brontotheres
Eocene mammals of Asia
Fossils of China
Taxa named by Henry Fairfield Osborn
Brontotheres of Asia